Hymns for a Dark Horse is an album by Bowerbirds.

Track listing

References

2007 albums
Bowerbirds (band) albums
Dead Oceans albums